Mamato Konko Forest Park is a forest park in the Gambia. It covers 431 hectares.

References

Forest parks of the Gambia